The Mainichi Film Award for Best Cinematography is a film award given at the Mainichi Film Awards.

List of winners

References

Cinematography
Awards established in 1946
1946 establishments in Japan
Lists of films by award
Awards for best cinematography